Scorched may refer to:

 Scorched (album), a 2004 album by Mark-Anthony Turnage and John Scofield
 Scorched (2003 film), a film starring John Cleese and Alicia Silverstone
 Scorched (play), a play by Wajdi Mouawad
 Scorched (2008 film), an Australian made-for-TV movie
 Scorched: South Africa's Changing Climate, a 2007 book about the effects of climate change on South Africa
 "Scorched" (Numbers), a 2005 episode of Numbers

See also
 Scorched Earth (disambiguation)
 Scorch (disambiguation)
 Scorcher (disambiguation)